Speak Up! It's So Dark is a 1993 Swedish drama film directed by Suzanne Osten. At the 29th Guldbagge Awards, Simon Norrthon was nominated for the Best Actor award and Niklas Rådström was nominated for Best Screenplay.

Plot
An elderly Jewish man (Etienne Glaser) befriends a young neo-nazi (Simon Norrthon) on a train and invites him to his home. Through a series of discussions the two gradually come to understand each other better.

Cast
 Etienne Glaser as Jacob
 Simon Norrthon as Sören the skinhead
 Anna-Yrsa Falenius as Raped Woman
 Anders Garpe as Sören's Father
 Gertrud Gidlund as Sören's Mother
 Pia Johansson as Nurse

Distribution
Speak Up! It's So Dark was shown at the 1993 Toronto Festival of Festivals. It was distributed on video in the United States by First Run Features.

Awards
 1993: Créteil International Women's Film Festival - Grand Prix (Suzanne Osten)

References

External links

 

1993 films
1993 drama films
Swedish drama films
1990s Swedish-language films
Films directed by Suzanne Osten
First Run Features films
1990s Swedish films